Strijbos or Strijbosch is a Dutch toponymic surname referring to a "contested forest" near Gemert, North Brabant.  People with the surname include:

 David Strijbos (born 1967), Dutch motocross world champion
 Jan P. Strijbos (1891–1983), Dutch naturalist, cineaste, photographer, journalist and writer
 Kevin Strijbos (born 1985), Belgian motocross racer competing 
 Sam Strijbosch (born 1995), Dutch football midfielder
 Sytse Strijbos (born 1944), Dutch philosopher and systems scientist

References

Dutch-language surnames
Toponymic surnames